Confesiones may refer to:
Confesiones (Monchy y Alexandra album), a 2002 album released by Dominican duo Monchy y Alexandra
Confesiones (Obie Bermúdez album), a 2003 album released by Puerto-Rican singer Obie Bermúdez

See also
 Confessions (disambiguation)